Sindh Premier League (abbreviated as ) is an upcoming Twenty20 league contested by six teams representing six cities of Sindh province. It is going to be launched to provide opportunities to cricket talent in remote areas of the province.

History 
Syed Nasir Hussain Shah, the provincial minister of local government announced that there would be a domestic cricket team for Sindh soon in June of 2022.

In March 2023, a launching ceremony was held in auditorium of Sindh Assembly and the guests included Shahid Afridi and Abdul Razzaq. The first season of the league will be played in Karachi.

Teams 
There are going to be six teams consisting the league namely: Karachi Ghazis, Hyderabad Bahadurs, Benazirabad Lals, Sukkur Patriots, Mirpurkhas Tigers and Larkana Challengers.

See also 

 Sindh
 T20 cricket

References 

Sport in Sindh
Cricket administration in Pakistan
Sports leagues in Pakistan
Twenty20 cricket leagues
Pakistani domestic cricket competitions
Sports leagues established in 2023